Wuzhi may refer to:

Wuzhi County, in Henan, China
Wuzhi Mountain, in Hainan, China
Wuzhi (Qi), ruler of the state of Qi in 685 BC